I Get Lonely in a Hurry is an album by George Jones, released on United Artists Records in 1964.

Background
The album marks the first appearance of "The Race Is On", which later became one of Jones's biggest hits and remained a concert staple throughout his long career. According to Bob Allen's book George Jones: The Life and Times of a Honky Tonk Legend, Don Rollins composed the song one day after visiting the Turf Paradise Race Track in Phoenix, Arizona. It features tongue-twisting lyrics that use the fast-paced images of a horse race to describe a broken relationship. Allen writes of Jones's memorable vocal: "By gleefully bending and stretching the notes and singing, at times, slightly ahead of or behind the song's fast-clipped meter, he embellished it with a subtle sense of tension and release that perfectly complemented the rapid-fire cascading effect of the song's lyrics." The album also contains "She's Mine", which would become a top ten hit for Jones on Musicor in 1969, and "Love's Gonna Live Here", a 1962 song written and popularized by Buck Owens, who was one of the few country singers who rivalled Jones's success in the 1960s.  "Book of Memories" is a cover of the Charlie Louvin song, "My Book of Memories" released earlier in 1964. "Least of All" was originally recorded by Sonny James earlier in 1964 as "Least of All You".  "Holiday for Love" was originally recorded by Webb Pierce in 1957.

Reception
I Get Lonely in a Hurry peaked at number 10 on the Billboard country albums chart. AllMusic calls Jones performance on "Book of Memories" "haunting".

Track listing
"I Get Lonely in a Hurry" (George Jones, "Country" Johnny Mathis, Virginia Franks)
"Book of Memories" (Bobby Austin)
"I'm Gonna Change Everything" (Alex Zanetis)
"The Race is On" (Don Rollins)
"Least of All" (Sonny James, Carole Smith)
"Gonna Have a Little Talk with You" (Oney Wheeler)
"I've Been Known to Cry" (Eddie Hallowell)
"Love's Gonna Live Here" (Buck Owens)
"Gold and Silver" (Shirley Legate)
"Holiday for Love" (Mel Tillis, Webb Pierce, Wayne P. Walker)
"She's Mine" (George Jones, Jack Ripley)
"Where Does a Little Tear Come From" (Marge Barton, Johnny MacRae)

References

1964 albums
George Jones albums
Albums produced by Pappy Daily
United Artists Records albums